The 1953 Tulane Green Wave football team was an American football team that represented Tulane University during the 1953 college football season as a member of the Southeastern Conference. In their second year under head coach Raymond Wolf, the team compiled a 1–8–1 record.

Schedule

References

Tulane
Tulane Green Wave football seasons
Tulane Green Wave football